The Digital Signal 4/NA (DS4/NA) in telecommunications, is a 139.264-Mbit/s aggregate-multiplexed signal, equivalent to 3 Digital Signal 3s or 2,016 Digital Signal 0s.

This link is commonly used for long distance fiber carriage of broadcast radio and television as a platform for the 270Mb/sec MPEG-2/ASI Transport Stream.  The circuits are in common use daily for digital transmission of broadcast television and radio, interconnecting Sport Arenas, Convention Centers, Television Stations and Broadcasters.  The connections themselves become part of long-haul serial data transmission over fiber.  As these are sent as purely serial data, no packetizing or bandwidth sharing takes place as with TCP/IP.

Carriers usually supplying these circuits are specialized, most often supplied in the US by Vyvx or The Switch.

A remote broadcast, a sports event for example, is typically carried over a DS4 from the venue to the television network on a full, unshared serial data circuit of 270 Megabits Per second.

Historically, when used with the appropriate gear, the circuit was used to emulate an analog standard definition circuit using a sampling rate of 12-15 MHz, carrying the samples in PCM format.  This replaced dedicated coaxial cable circuits with managed digital circuits but that use became rare in the early 21st century,

See also
Outline of telecommunication

References

Telecommunications standards
Multiplexing